Mohammadabad (also Romanized as Moḩammadābād) is a village in Chupanan Rural District, Anarak District, Nain County, Isfahan Province, Iran. At the 2006 census, its population was 14, in 8 families.

References 

Populated places in Nain County